The 2017 NCAA Division III women's basketball tournament was the 36th annual tournament hosted by the NCAA to determine the national champion of Division III women's collegiate basketball in the United States.

Amherst defeated Tufts in the championship game, 52–29, to claim the Lord Jeffs' second Division III national title and first since 2011.

The championship rounds were hosted by Calvin University at the Van Noord Arena in Grand Rapids, Michigan.

Bracket

Final Four

All-tournament team
 Ali Doswell, Amherst
 Meredith Doswell, Amherst
 Devon Byrd, Christopher Newport
 Kaitlin Langer, St. Thomas (MN)
 Michela North, Tufts

See also
 2017 NCAA Division I women's basketball tournament
 2017 NCAA Division II women's basketball tournament
 2017 NAIA Division I women's basketball tournament
 2017 NAIA Division II women's basketball tournament
 2017 NCAA Division III men's basketball tournament

References

 
NCAA Division III women's basketball tournament
2017 in sports in Michigan